Muhammad Kashif (born 22 October 1987) is a cricketer who plays for the Kuwait national cricket team. He played in the 2013 ICC World Cricket League Division Six tournament. In June 2019, he was named as the captain of Kuwait's Twenty20 International (T20I) squad for their series against Qatar. The following month, he was named as the captain of Kuwait's squad for the Regional Finals of the 2018–19 ICC T20 World Cup Asia Qualifier tournament,  He finished the tournament as the leading run-scorer, with 143 runs in three matches, and was named the Player of the Series. In October 2021, he was named in Kuwait's squad for the Group A matches in the 2021 ICC Men's T20 World Cup Asia Qualifier.

References

External links
 

1987 births
Living people
Kuwaiti cricketers
Kuwait Twenty20 International cricketers
Pakistani expatriates in Kuwait
Place of birth missing (living people)